National College of Computer Studies (NCCS) is a private college located in Paknajol, Kathmandu, Nepal. It was founded in 1998 as a computer training and software development institute. It later expanded to include university education in 2003 and high school education from 2005.

Academics 
It is affiliated with Nepal’s oldest Tribhuvan University (TU) and National Examination Board (NEB). The department offers a four-year Bachelor in Information Management, three years of bachelor of hotel management course, four year Bachelors of Science in Computer Science and Information Technology, and planning to extend Masters level courses.

Scholarships 
NCCS provide scholarships to students with excellent academic achievements.

college 
NCCS is located at Paknajol. The campus has a library, cafeteria and computer lab. The college has a basketball court, volleyball court, and snooker and each year a sports feat is organized to promote the sports skills of students and develop sportsmanship among the participating students.

References

External links 
 Official National College of Computer Studies Website
 Tribhuvan University Website
 BIM forum

Universities and colleges in Nepal
Tribhuvan University
1998 establishments in Nepal